Vongphet Sylisay (born 3 June 1989) is a Laotian footballer who plays for Lao Army. He played for Laos at the 2012 AFF Suzuki Cup and the 2007 Southeast Asian Games.

References
 goal.com 
 

1989 births
Laotian footballers
Living people
Association football midfielders
Laos international footballers